Labyrinth of Dreams can refer to:

 Labyrinth of Dreams (album), a 1992 album by Elegy
 Labyrinth of Dreams (film), a 1997 Japanese film